The following is a list of medals, awards and decorations in use in Poland. Most of them are awarded by the Polish Army, but some of them are civilian decorations that may be worn by the military personnel.

Most of these decorations ceased to be awarded; some were awarded before the World War II only, and some in the People's Republic of Poland only; order of some of them was changed by law.

The state awards may be awarded only by the President of Poland. The order of precedence was last reformed in 2007. The order of precedence is: 6 orders (order) in specific order of precedence (see table below); other orders in order they were received; 12 crosses (krzyż), 3 medals (medal) and 6 stars (gwiazda) in specific order of precedence; other crosses and awards in order they were received.

National orders

Military orders

Currently recognized state awards subject to order of precedence

Presidential awards

Ministerial awards

Former awards

See also 
 List of military decorations
 Krzyż Powstania Warszawskiego
 Polish Armed Forces
 History of Poland

References 

 Regulation of the Polish President of 10 November 1992 on the description, material, dimensions of Designs and how to wear badges and circumstances of decoration (in Polish)
 Regulation of the Polish President on 31 July 2007 amending the Regulation on the description, material, dimensions, designs, drawings and how to wear badges and the circumstances of orders and decorations (in Polish)
 Regulation of the Polish President on 15 November 2010 amending the Regulation on the description, material, dimensions, designs, drawings and how to wear badges and the circumstances of orders and decorations (in Polish)

 
Lists of orders, decorations, and medals